Psychopathia Sexualis is the seventh album by Whitehouse released in 1982 on the Come Organisation label. It was on the liner notes for the album that principal member William Bennett first used the term "Power electronics" to describe the group's music.

Overview
Psychopathia Sexualis returns to the theme of serial killers, the subject of most of the songs. Every song title bearing the name of serial killer opens with a spoken introduction, detailing the profile of the serial killer. The introductions are spoken in Spanish, except "Edward Paisnel" spoken in Catalan. While the songs continue to utilize the high pitched feedback known in most albums during the Come Organisation era, the album pursues a diverse sound. Examples include the tape manipulation on the introduction in "Edward Paisnel" and the pulsating beats in the opening track "Peter Kürten".

The songs "Peter Kürten" and "Boston Strangler" (pseudonym for the serial killer Albert de Salvo) differ from the songs "Dedicated to Peter Kürten" and "Dedicated to Albert de Salvo - Sadist and Mass Slayer" found on their previous albums. Live Action 4 (Complete) is, as the title suggests, Whitehouse's fourth live concert.

Psychopathia Sexualis was originally limited to 500 copies on vinyl on the group owned record label Come Organisation. Unlike most of their albums, Psychopathia Sexualis has not been reissued by Susan Lawly because the master tapes have been lost. Though possible to master from vinyl or cassette with the appropriate technology to remove the scratching and cracking sounds, the group worries that the content of the album would be altered given the already noisy nature of the music.  However, the German label Vinyl On Demand released a vinyl box set of Come Organisation titles in 2020, limited to 585 copies.  Among its 10 LPs and one 10" EP was Psychopathia Sexualis.

Track listing
"Peter Kürten" – 3:51
"Edward Paisnel" – 3:44
"Boston Strangler" – 4:00
"Peter Sutcliffe" – 3:34
"Fritz Haarman" – 4:10
"Ian Brady and Myra Hindley" – 2:58
"Graham Young" – 4:36
"Vulcan Air Attack Mission" – 1:53
"Pleazure für Frauen" – 2:21
"Live Action 4 (Complete)" – 20:55
"Genesis of the New Weapons" – 1:01

Personnel
 William Bennett – vocals, synthesizers, production
 Peter McKay – production
 Dave Kenny - production

References

External links
Whitehouse 1982-1987 recording dossier at Susan Lawly

Whitehouse (band) albums
1982 albums
Cultural depictions of Peter Kürten
Cultural depictions of Albert DeSalvo
Works about Fritz Haarmann
Cultural depictions of Ian Brady
Cultural depictions of Myra Hindley
Cultural depictions of serial killers